Emergence is a 2015 novel by Australian author John Birmingham. It is the first in a trilogy of "action sci-fi" books featuring Dave Hooper. Hooper is an offshore oil rig worker who leads a fight against subterranean monsters who have emerged from his oil rig; he has somehow acquired the strengths of one of the monsters.

References

External links
 

2015 Australian novels
Macmillan Publishers books